The is the definite article in English.

The, or THE, maMaryy also refer to:

 Ṭhē, a letter of the Arabic alphabet
 The (Cyrillic), a Cyrillic letter used in the Bashkir and Chuvash languages
 The (imprint), an imprint of the German VDM Publishing
 The (surname), alternative spelling of the Chinese surname Zheng commonly used in Indonesia
 The The, a British music group
 The..., an EP by JYJ
 "The", episode 22 of season 2 in the List of Aqua Teen Hunger Force episodes
 THE, the IATA code for Teresina Airport in the state of Piauí, Brazil
 THE, the MTR code for Tin Heng stop, a light rail stop in Hong Kong, China 
 THE, the National Rail code for Theale railway station in the county of Berkshire, UK
 "T.H.E. (The Hardest Ever)", a song by American musical artist will.i.am
 THE multiprogramming system, a computer operating system
 Technische Hogeschool Eindhoven, now Eindhoven University of Technology, Netherlands
 The Hessling Editor, a text editor modeled on the VM/CMS editor XEDIT
 The Humane Environment (now named Archy), a software system
 Times Higher Education, UK publication
 Trans Hudson Express Tunnel, a proposed rail tunnel in the New York metro area, US
 Transhiatal esophagectomy, a surgical procedure

See also 
 
 
 
 
 Thee (disambiguation)
 Teh, an Internet slang neologism